Forkhead box protein L2 is a protein that in humans is encoded by the FOXL2 gene.

Function 

FOXL2 (OMIM 605597) is a transcription factor belonging to the forkhead box (FOX) superfamily, characterized by the forkhead box/winged-helix DNA-binding domain. 
FOXL2 plays an important role in ovarian development and function. In postnatal ovaries FOXL2 regulates granulosa cell differentiation and supports the growth of the pre-ovulatory follicles during adult life.
In addition, the FOXL2 protein will prevent the formation of testes by suppressing expression of SOX9. In mice, FOXL2 is also expressed in pituitary cells where it is required for FSH expression.

Regulation 

FOXL2 has several post-translational modifications that modulate its stability, subcellular localization and pro-apoptotic activity. By a yeast-two-hybrid screening, 10 novel protein partners of FOXL2 were discovered. The interactions were confirmed by co-immunoprecipitation experiments between FOXL2 and CXXC4 (IDAX), CXXC5 (RINF/WID), CREM, GMEB1 (P96PIF), NR2C1 (TR2), SP100, RPLP1, BAF (BANF1), XRCC6 (KU70) and SIRT1.

Clinical significance

Sex determination
FOXL2 is involved in sex determination. FOXL2 knockout in mature mouse ovaries appears to cause the ovary's somatic cells to transdifferentiate to the equivalent cell types ordinarily found in the testes. Polled Intersex Syndrome in goats is caused by a biallelic loss-of-function in FOXL2 transcription and leads to in utero female-to-male sex-reversal.

Eyebrow thickness

Several SNPs (Single Variant Polymorphisms) in the genomic region 3q23 overlapping the forkhead box L2 (FOXL2) were found associated with eyebrow thickness. In Europeans, East Asians, and South Asians, the derived allele is above ~90% frequency, and in Africans, it is above ~75%. Native Americans, particularly Peruvians, have a relatively high frequency of the homozygous ancestral allele, which significantly decreases eyebrow thickness. All primates and archaic humans share the ancestral allele.

Blepharophimosis–ptosis–epicanthus inversus syndrome
Mutations in this gene are a cause of blepharophimosis, ptosis, epicanthus inversus syndrome and/or premature ovarian failure (POF) 3. Predicting the occurrence of POF based on the nature of the missense mutations in FOXL2 was a medical challenge. However, a correlation between the transcriptional activity of FOXL2 variants and the type of BPES was found. Moreover, by studying the effects of natural and artificial mutations in the forkhead domain of FOXL2, a clear correlation between the orientation of amino-acid side chains in the DNA-binding domain and transcriptional activity is founded, providing the first (in silico) predictive tool of the effects of FOXL2 missense mutations.

Adult granulosa cell tumors
A missense mutation in the FOXL2 gene, C134W, is found in adult granulosa cell tumors but not in other ovarian cancers nor in juvenile granulosa cell tumors.

Endometriosis
In addition to ovarian expression of FOXL2, there have been recent studies to suggest that overexpression of FOXL2 has been implicated in endometriosis in addition to activin A.

Other deregulations 
One study has found that FOXL2 is required for SF-1-induced ovarian AMH regulation by interactions between FOXL2 protein and SF-1; a mutated FOXL2 could not interact with SF-1 normally and thus could not regulate ovarian AMH as normal.

In a knockout study in mice, the granulosa cells of the ovaries failed to undergo the squamous-to-cuboidal transition, which led to the arrest of folliculogenesis.

See also 
 FOX proteins

References

Further reading

External links 
 
 GeneReviews/NCBI/NIH/UW entry on Blepharophimosis, Ptosis, and Epicanthus Inversus

Forkhead transcription factors